Kurt Hessenberg (17 August 1908 – 17 June 1994) was a German composer and professor at the Hochschule für Musik und Darstellende Kunst in Frankfurt.

Life 
Kurt Hessenberg was born on 17 August 1908 in Frankfurt, as the fourth and last child of the lawyer Eduard Hessenberg and his wife Emma, née Kugler. Among his ancestors was Heinrich Hoffmann, whose famous children's book Struwwelpeter Hessenberg was to arrange for children's choir (op. 49) later in his life. From 1927–1931 Hessenberg studied at the Leipzig Conservatory. Among his teachers were Günter Raphael (composition) and Robert Teichmüller (piano). In 1933 Hessenberg became a teacher at the Hoch'sche Konservatorium in Frankfurt am Main, where he himself had taken his earliest music lessons. In 1940 Hessenberg received the "Nationaler Kompositionspreis" (national prize for composition), joined the NSDAP in 1942, and in 1951 he was awarded the Robert-Schumann-Prize of the city of Düsseldorf for his cantata "Vom Wesen und Vergehen" op. 45. Hessenberg was appointed professor of composition at the Hochschule für Musik und Darstellende Kunst in 1953 and taught there until his retirement in 1973. Kurt Hessenberg died in Frankfurt am Main on 17 June 1994.

Hessenberg's work contributed significantly to the repertoire of the Protestant churches in the 20th century. Among his most noted students were Hans Zender and Peter Cahn.

Notes

References 
.
. (English translation accessible online)

Further reading

Catalogues of Hessenberg's works

Further reading 
 
 
 
 
 
 
 Thomson, Virgil (1946) "German Composers", New York Herald Tribune, October 13, 1946. Reprinted in

External links 
www.kurthessenberg.de – Website dedicated to Kurt Hessenberg. Contains biography, bibliography, discography and a few links. (German)

1908 births
1994 deaths
German classical composers
20th-century classical composers
Hoch Conservatory alumni
Officers Crosses of the Order of Merit of the Federal Republic of Germany
Burials at Frankfurt Main Cemetery
German male classical composers
20th-century German composers
20th-century German male musicians